The Burkina Faso women's national volleyball team represents Burkina Faso in international women's volleyball competitions and friendly matches.

References

External links
 Burkina Faso Volleyball Federation

National women's volleyball teams
Volleyball
Volleyball in Burkina Faso
Women's sport in Burkina Faso